Hybanthus monopetalus, the slender violet-bush, is a common plant in the violet family.
It is found in eastern Australia in dry eucalyptus woodland, often in sandstone or granite derived soils, where it is seen growing in relatively shady moist sites, surrounded by dry open country. It may reach 30 cm in height. Flowers form on short racemes at the end of branches. The specific epithet monopetalus translates to "one petal".

References

monopetalus
Flora of New South Wales
Flora of Victoria (Australia)
Flora of Queensland
Flora of South Australia